The Flywhale FW650 was a two-seat amphibious sports aircraft designed and built in Germany by Uniplanes GmbH. It is now owned and built by Dornier Seawings under the name DS-2C.

Design and development

The Flywhale, built mainly from carbon fibre composite materials, is a flying boat style amphibian, with a single step hull and sponsons rather than wing tip floats. It accommodates two in side-by-side seating fitted with a single control between both seats. The design also provides room for two people to sleep in the fuselage. A large, one-piece canopy hinges forward for access. Behind the seats is a  baggage area. The Flywhale has short-legged, tricycle landing gear with mainwheels retracting backwards into the sponsons. It can operate on land and water.

Its high cantilever wings are trapezoidal in plan and can be removed for transport. Its empennage is cruciform, with the horizontal tail part-way up a triangular fin and rudder. A  Rotax 912 iS flat-four engine is mounted on a necked pylon over the wing in tractor configuration.  This originally drove a two blade propeller but more recently a three-bladed one has replaced it.  A BRS ballistic parachute is an option.

The Flywhale flew for the first time on 13 September 2013.  A second airframe has been completed, including modifications suggested by the flight trials of the first, and this flew in the summer of 2015.

On 19 January 2022, Dornier Seawings announced that they had acquired all intellectual property and production assets of the Flywhale project, which would henceforth by known as the Dornier Seawings DS-2C, alongside the larger Dornier Seastar.

Variants
Adventure Standard version as in Specifications

Specifications (Adventure)

References

External links

Amphibious aircraft
2010s German sport aircraft
High-wing aircraft
Single-engined tractor aircraft
Aircraft first flown in 2013
Flying boats